Minnie is an unincorporated community in  Floyd County, Kentucky, United States.

The community was so named for the fact a large share of the first settlers were miners.

References

Unincorporated communities in Floyd County, Kentucky
Unincorporated communities in Kentucky